The 1973 San Francisco 49ers season was the franchise's 24th season in the National Football League and their 28th overall. They began the season hoping to improve on their previous years' output of 8–5–1, and looking to make the playoffs for the fourth consecutive season. However, the team finished 5–9  and failed to qualify for the playoffs. After the season, quarterback John Brodie retired after 16 years with the 49ers.

Offseason

NFL Draft

Roster

Schedule

Game summaries

Week 2

Standings

References 

San Francisco 49ers seasons
San Francisco 49ers
1973 in San Francisco
San